Cho Po-yuan (born 27 March 1965) is a Taiwanese politician. He was the Magistrate of Changhua County from 20 December 2005 until 25 December 2014.

Education
Cho received his bachelor's and master's degrees in law from National Taiwan University and National Taiwan Ocean University, respectively.

Changhua County Magistrate

Changhua County Magistrate election
Cho was elected as the Magistrate of Changhua County after winning the 2005 Taiwan (ROC) local election under Kuomintang on 3 December 2005 and assumed office on 20 December 2005. He was then reelected for the second term after winning the 2009 Taiwan (ROC) local election on 5 December 2009 and took office on 20 December 2009.

Allegation of graft
Cho is currently under investigation for allegations of graft; his brother has been detained by police.

Later political career
Cho finished fourth of four candidates in the 2021 Kuomintang chairmanship election.

References

1965 births
Living people
Politicians of the Republic of China on Taiwan from Changhua County
Magistrates of Changhua County
National Taiwan University alumni